Mitromorpha thalaoides is a species of sea snail, a marine gastropod mollusk in the family Mitromorphidae.

Description
The length of the shell varies between 3 mm and 4.1 mm.

Distribution
This marine species occurs off the Loyalty Islands, Vanuatu and the Philippines.

References

Description of four new shallow water Mitromorpha species from the western Pacific (Gastropoda: Mitromorphidae). Visaya 4(2):: 21–27

External links
 MNHN, Paris: Mitromorpha thalaoides (holotype)
 

thalaoides
Gastropods described in 2014